Conrad Editora (also known as Conrad) is a book publishing company in Brazil. Generally known as one of the most popular distributors of manga and manhwa in the Brazilian Portuguese language.

Publishing history

Manga
 Absolute Boyfriend, by the name of Zettai Kareshi: O Namorado Perfeito
 Adolf (2006 - 2007)
 Bambi and Her Pink Gun, by the name of Bambi (2006)
 Battle Royale (ongoing)
 Blade of the Immortal, by the name of Blade - A Lâmina do Imortal (cancelled)
 Buddha, by the name of Buda (2005)
 Dr. Slump (cancelled)
 Dragon Ball (later part as Dragon Ball Z) (completed)
 Definitive Edition (2005 - cancelled)
 Fushigi Yūgi
 Gon (2003 - ongoing)
 MegaMan NT Warrior (cancelled)
 Neon Genesis Evangelion (cancelled)
 Neon Genesis Evangelion: Angelic Days, by the name of Neon Genesis Evangelion: The Iron Maiden 2nd (2006 - cancelled)
 One Piece (cancelled)
 Paradise Kiss
 Pokémon: The Electric Tale of Pikachu, by the name of Pokémon: As Aventuras Elétricas de Pikachu (1999 - cancelled)
 Saint Seiya, by the name of Cavaleiros do Zodíaco (completed)
 Saint Seiya Episode G, by the name of Cavaleiros do Zodíaco Episódio G (2005 - ongoing)
 Slam Dunk (completed)
 Speed Racer: The Original Manga (completed)
 Uzumaki
 Vagabond, by the name of Vagabond: A História de Musashi (cancelled)

Manhwa
 Angry
 Banya: The Explosive Delivery Man
 Dangu
 Gui
 Model
 Ragnarök (2004 - ongoing)
 Chonchu, by the name Chonchu O Guerreiro Maldito

References

External links
Conrad Editora

Book publishing companies of Brazil
Comic book publishing companies of Brazil
Manga distributors
Manhwa distributors